Khora is a city in Uttar Pradesh, India.

Khora may also refer to:

 Khôra, a concept in philosophy
 Khora, or Chora, the name of several places in Greece
 Khora people, an ethnic group of the Andaman Islands
 Khora language, their language
 Khora (dance), a Ukrainian folk dance

See also 
 Khorra, a village in Haryana
 Khura
 Kohra